Abel Beach (February 7, 1829 – June 19, 1899), born in Groton, New York, was a well-known poet and one of the six founders of the international fraternity Theta Delta Chi.

Biography
After graduating from Union College in 1849, he taught Latin and Greek at the University of Iowa.  Abel Beach owned a business involved in the stationary trade, and was later an insurance and pension attorney in Iowa City, Iowa.  His poems appeared in the leading literary periodicals of the time.

Abel Beach was one of the six original founders of international fraternity Theta Delta Chi, founded in 1847.

Poetry

Abel Beach, Western Airs: Choice Selections from the Miscellaneous Poems (Buffalo: The Peter Paul Book Company, 1895)
_, P.S.: The Mysteries of Life and Other Late Poems Supplemental to Western Airs (Iowa City, Iowa: [s.n.], 1897)

Poems

Abel Beach, Old Settlers of Johnson County, a poem read at the annual reunion and pic-nic at Iowa City, August 18, 1892 (Iowa City, Iowa: Republican, 1892)

External links
Strangers to Us All

1829 births
Poets from New York (state)
Union College (New York) alumni
1899 deaths
Theta Delta Chi founders
Iowa State University faculty
People from Groton, New York
19th-century American poets
American male poets
19th-century American male writers